Robert Tideman (often Robert Tideman of Winchcombe) was a medieval Bishop of Llandaff and Bishop of Worcester.

Tideman was consecrated Bishop of Llandaff on 13 October 1393 and translated to the see of Worcester on 15 June 1395.

Tideman  enjoyed influence at the court of King Richard II of England.

Tideman died on 13 June 1401.

References

Bishops of Worcester
Bishops of Llandaff
1401 deaths
14th-century English Roman Catholic bishops
15th-century English Roman Catholic bishops
Year of birth unknown